Pesyan (also Romanized as Pesyān; also known as Pasiyan, Pesyānlū, and Pisian) is a village in Minjavan-e Gharbi Rural District, Minjavan District, Khoda Afarin County, East Azerbaijan Province, Iran. At the 2006 census, its population was 240, in 45 families.

References 

Populated places in Khoda Afarin County